Paromitar Ek Din ( Paromitar Êkdin, lit. "One day of Paromita's", English title: House of Memories) is a 2000 Indian Bengali drama film directed by Aparna Sen.

Plot
The film explores the dual themes of friendship and loneliness. Sanaka (Aparna Sen) and Paromita (Rituparna Sengupta) are mother and daughter-in-law who, despite differences in age, backgrounds and temperaments, build a strong bond together. But when Paromita's marriage to Sanaka's son breaks down, social mores prevent the women from remaining close friends.
While Paromita remarries and begins a new life, her mother-in-law, Sanaka, is left heartbroken and alone and eventually falls seriously ill. When Paromita learns of her friend's deterioration, she is compelled to flout convention, and returns to nurse Sanaka on her deathbed.

Cast 
 Aparna Sen as Sanaka
 Rituparna Sengupta as Paromita
 Sohini Sengupta as Sanjukta (Khuku)
 Soumitra Chatterjee as Moni Biswas (Moni-daa or Moni-mama)
 Rajatava Dutta as Biru (Paromita's husband and Sanaka's younger son)
 Rita Koiral as Sanaka's elder daughter in law
 Rajesh Sharma as Rajeev Shrivastav (Paromita's second husband)
Dulal Lahiri 
Kaushik Banerjee

Awards
The film had won many national and international awards –

2000 – Ecumenical Jury Award at the 35th International Film festival of Karlovy Vary
2000 – Best Film recommendation from the FIPRESCI Jury at 3rd International Film Festival of Mumbai
2000 – National Film Award for Best Supporting Actress for Sohini Sengupta
2000 – National Film Award for Best Feature Film in Bengali
2000 – National Film Award for Best Female Playback Singer – Jayashree Dasgupta – "Hridoy Amar Prokash Holo..."

External links

Chatterjee, Shoma A. Memories of another day, Movie Reviews, Rediff.com, 8 February 2000.

References

2000 drama films
Bengali-language Indian films
Films set in Kolkata
Films featuring a Best Supporting Actress National Film Award-winning performance
Best Bengali Feature Film National Film Award winners
2000s Bengali-language films
Films directed by Aparna Sen